Pelodytes atlanticus, the Lusitanian parsley frog,  is a species of frog in the family Pelodytidae, known as "parsley frogs" because of their green speckles. This species is only found in Portugal.

Description
Adult Lusitanian parsley frogs have smooth or granular with a scattering of dark-coloured tubercles. The dorsal surface varies from olive, greenish-brown, dark brown or greenish-grey and is flecked with green specks.

Distribution and habitat
The Lusitanian parsley frog is endemic to Portugal. This species is found mostly in temporary ponds in traditional farmland.

References

Pelodytes
Amphibians described in 2017
Amphibians of Europe
Fauna of Portugal
Endemic amphibians of the Iberian Peninsula